This article is a list of United States Air Force aircraft sustainment squadrons both active, inactive, and historical. An aircraft sustainment squadron's purpose is to maintain the fleet in a state of combat readiness.

List

See also

List of United States Air Force squadrons

Aircraft sustainment